Route 66 is a 1998 American film directed by Steve Austin and starring Alana Austin, Diane Ladd, Richard Moll and Pamela Bach.

Cast
Alana Austin
Jerry Asher ... Billy
Pamela Bach ... Elizabeth
Nick Benedict ... Jeff
Richard Danielson ... Skeeter
Diane Ladd
Leslie Lauten ... Bernice
Kirsten Maryott ... Ms. Barnes
Micah May ... Danny
Richard Moll

References

External links
 

1998 films
1990s English-language films
American romantic drama films
1990s American films